Roy Alvin Baldwin (January 2, 1885 – October 2, 1940) was an American politician. He served as a Democratic member of the Texas House of Representatives, representing the 119th and 122nd districts.

Life and career
Born in Mercer County, Missouri, Baldwin was the son of Lucinda Ellen Garriott. He attended the University of New Mexico.

In 1920, Baldwin was elected to represent the 122nd district of the Texas House of Representatives, succeeding William H. Bledsoe, who had gone to serve in the Texas Senate. In 1923, he won election to represent the 119th district of the Texas House, succeeding John Quaid. He was succeeded by Dewey Young for his 122nd district seat, and in 1925 was succeeded in the 119th district by James K. Wester. As a legislator, Baldwin supported the creation of Texas Tech University.

Badwin, was a lawyer, died in October 1940 in Slaton, Texas, at the age of 55. He was buried in Englewood Cemetery.

References 

1885 births
1940 deaths
People from Mercer County, Missouri
People from Washington County, Oregon
People from Lubbock County, Texas
Democratic Party members of the Texas House of Representatives
Texas lawyers
20th-century American politicians
University of New Mexico alumni
Burials in Texas